The 2016 Superbike World Championship was the 29th season of the Superbike World Championship. Jonathan Rea won his second consecutive Superbike World Championship title at the first race of the last round at Losail, while Kawasaki had secured the manufacturers' title at the previous event at Jerez. Chaz Davies won the most races this season with Davies winning 11 races to Rea's 9.

Race calendar and results
In comparison with the previous season, the calendar saw the discontinuation of the Algarve round and the return of Lausitzring; Autodromo Nazionale Monza, which was also due to reappear on 23–24 July as the tenth round—subject to track homologation—was removed from the calendar on 1 April 2016; the round was definitively cancelled the following 29 April, as no replacement venue had ultimately been found.

After changes in the standard weekend timetable, the first race, which was previously run on Sunday along with the second one, was scheduled to be held on Saturday.

Entry list

All entries used Pirelli tyres.

Championship standings

Riders' championship

Bold – Pole positionItalics – Fastest lap

Manufacturers' championship

Notes

References

External links

 
Superbike World Championship seasons
World